Accent on Love is a 1941 American drama film directed and filmed by Ray McCarey and written by John Larkin. The film stars George Montgomery, Osa Massen, J. Carrol Naish, Cobina Wright, Stanley Clements and Minerva Urecal. It was released on July 11, 1941 by 20th Century Fox.

Plot

Unhappily married, John Worth Hyndman wants to leave his spouse and her father's company, Triton Realty, where he is a vice president. His wife Linda scoffs and says without his father-in-law, John wouldn't even be able to find a job digging ditches.

Trying to calm down, taking a walk, John happens across a team of actual ditchdiggers from a WPA project. He asks the foreman Manuel for a job, but Manuel is suspicious because John is well-dressed and turns him down. Manuel's daughter Osa advises John to change his appearance. In work clothes, digging voluntarily, John gets the job.

Weeks go by without the workers knowing John's true identity. Osa falls in love with him. Upset by their living conditions at home, Manuel's family protests to the landlord, who is John's father-in-law T. J. Triton.

Manuel, Osa and the others feel betrayed when they learn the truth. John wins back everyone's trust, makes Triton see the error of his ways and lets a happy Osa know that Linda has left him to get a divorce.

Cast   
George Montgomery as John Worth Hyndman
Osa Massen as Osa
J. Carrol Naish as Manuel Lombroso 
Cobina Wright as Linda Hyndman
Stanley Clements as Patrick Henry Lombroso
Minerva Urecal as Teresa Lombroso
Thurston Hall as T.J. Triton
Irving Bacon as Mr. Smedley
Leonard Carey as Flowers
Oscar O'Shea as Magistrate
John T. Murray as Wardman

References

External links 
 

1941 films
1940s English-language films
20th Century Fox films
American drama films
1941 drama films
Films directed by Ray McCarey
American black-and-white films
1940s American films